γ-Hydroxyvaleric acid (GHV), also known as 4-methyl-GHB, is a designer drug related to γ-hydroxybutyric acid (GHB). It is sometimes seen on the grey market as a legal alternative to GHB, but with lower potency and higher toxicity, properties which have tended to limit its recreational use.

γ-Valerolactone (GVL) acts as a prodrug to GHV, analogously to how γ-butyrolactone (GBL) is a prodrug to GHB.

See also
 1,4-Butanediol (1-4-BD)
 Aceburic acid
 Valerenic acid
 Valeric acid

References

Hydroxy acids
GABAB receptor agonists
GHB receptor agonists
Designer drugs
Euphoriants
Hypnotics